Robert Carney (born 19 December 1947) is an Indigenous Australian retired boxer. Carney competed at the 1968 Mexico Olympics in the flyweight division.

1968 Olympic results
Below is the record of Robert Carney, an Australian flyweight boxer who competed at the 1968 Mexico City Olympics:

 Round of 32: lost to Tito Pereyra (Argentina) by decision, 1-4

References

External links 
 
 

1947 births
Living people
Australian male boxers
Indigenous Australian boxers
Indigenous Australian Olympians
Olympic boxers of Australia
Boxers at the 1968 Summer Olympics
Flyweight boxers